Eum-u (음우, 陰友) (?-271) was the prime minister of Goguryeo during the reigns of Kings Jungcheon and Seocheon.

Background 
Prime Minister Eum-u's last name is unknown, and therefore, his ancestry cannot be traced. It is known, however, that he was from the Biryu-Bu of Goguryeo, and fathered at least one son, Sang-nu, who would succeed Eum-u as prime minister of Goguryeo.

Life 
Historical records provide few details on the life and background of prime minister Eum-u. Eum-u became prime minister of Goguryeo in the year 254, succeeding Myeongnim Eosu. The only other fact that is revealed is, Eum-u died in the year 271, and was succeeded by his son Sang-nu.

See also 
 Three Kingdoms of Korea
 Goguryeo

Sources 
 Samguk Sagi, Goguryeo Bon-Gi

Goguryeo people
History of Korea
3rd-century heads of government